Green Dolphin Street may refer to:
 Green Dolphin Street (novel), a 1944 historical novel by Elizabeth Goudge
 Green Dolphin Street (film), a 1947 MGM film starring Lana Turner, based on the novel
 "On Green Dolphin Street" (song), a 1947 song written for the film
 On Green Dolphin Street (Bill Evans album), 1959
 On Green Dolphin Street (Archie Shepp album), 1977
 On Green Dolphin Street (novel), a 2001 novel by Sebastian Faulks, named for the 1958 Miles Davis rendition of the song

See also 
 Green Street (disambiguation)